Ron Richards may refer to:

 Ron Richards (boxer) (1910–1967), indigenous Australian boxer of the 1930s and 1940s
 Ron Richards (footballer, born 1928) (1928–2013), Australian rules footballer for Collingwood
 Ron Richards (footballer, born 1927), Australian rules footballer for Footscray
 Ron Richards (producer) (1929–2009), British record producer, best known for discovering The Hollies
 Ron Richards (ski jumper) (born 1963), Canadian ski jumper
 Ronald Richards (1908–1994), Australian Anglican bishop
 Ronald Richards (lawyer), American lawyer
 George Ronald Richards (1905–1985), known as Ron Richards, police officer and deputy director-general of the Australian Security Intelligence Organisation